Patton Ki Bazi is a 1986 Indian Hindi-language film directed by Ram Govind for Balaji Films, starring Rajan Sippy, Khushboo, Swapna and Gulshan Grover.

Plot

Patton Ki Bazi is an action film. The plot includes Mahesh (Rajan Sippy) who comes to Mumbai and falls in love with Preet(Khushboo) who is Seth Oberoi's daughter. Mahesh is good at playing cards and soon he becomes the biggest gambler of the city.

Cast
Rajan Sippy as Mahesh Prasad
Khushboo as Preet Oberoi
Swapna as Mona 
Vinod Mehra as Inspector Vinod Saxena
Gulshan Grover as Ranjeet
Bharat Kapoor as Balwant Sethi 'Billa'

Songs
Lyrics: Maya Govind

References

External links
 

1986 films
1980s Hindi-language films
Indian action films
1986 action films